The Halberstadt C.IX was a German single-engined reconnaissance biplane of World War I, built by Halberstädter Flugzeugwerke. It was derived from the Halberstadt C.V, with a more powerful supercharged 230 hp Hiero engine.

Specifications

See also

References

Further reading

External links

Military aircraft of World War I
1910s German military reconnaissance aircraft
C.IX
Single-engined tractor aircraft
Biplanes
Aircraft first flown in 1918